The Liga MX, officially known as the Liga BBVA MX for sponsorship reasons, is the top professional football division in Mexico. Formerly known as the Primera División de México (Mexican First Division), it is contested by 18 clubs and is divided into two tournaments – "Apertura" and "Clausura"– which typically run from July to December (the former) and January to May (the latter). The champion of each tournament is decided via a playoff ("Liguilla") system. Since 2020, promotion and relegation has been suspended, which is to last until 2026.

According to the IFFHS, Liga MX was ranked as the 10th strongest league in the first decade of the 21st century. According to CONCACAF, the league – with an average attendance of 25,557 during the 2014–15 season – draws the largest crowds on average of any football league in the Americas and the third largest crowds of any professional sports league in North America, behind only the National Football League and Major League Baseball, and ahead of the Canadian Football League. It is also the fourth most attended football league in the world behind Germany's Bundesliga, England's Premier League and Spain's La Liga. The Liga MX ranks second in terms of television viewership in the United States, behind the English Premier League.

Club América has won the league a record 13 times, followed by Guadalajara with 12 titles. In all, twenty-four teams have won the Primera División/Liga MX title at least once.

History

Amateur era

Prior to the Liga Mayor, there was no national football league in Mexico, and football competitions were held within relatively small geographical regions. The winners of the Primera Fuerza, a local league consisting of teams near and around Mexico City, was regarded as the then national competition although there were other regional leagues, such as in Veracruz, Liga Amateur de Puebla the Jalisco and the Liga Amateur del Bajío|Bajío that had talented clubs. Many club owners were keen to remain amateur although they paid players under the table. The increasing interest in football would not thwart a unified professional football system in Mexico. The professional national league was established in 1943.

Professional era
The Federación Mexicana de Fútbol Asociación (F.M.F.) announcement of the nation's first professional league brought interest from many clubs to join. The F.M.F. announced that 10 clubs would form the Liga Mayor (Major League).  The league was founded by six clubs from the Primera Fuerza of Mexico City, two clubs from the Liga Occidental, and two from the Liga Veracruzana.

Founding members

Primera Fuerza: América, Asturias, Atlante, Veracruz, Necaxa, and Marte.
Liga Occidental De Jalisco: Atlas and Guadalajara.
Liga Amateur de Veracruz: ADO and Moctezuma.

Reformation
Throughout the late 1950s and early 1960s, many small clubs faced economic difficulties which were attributed to the lack of international competition by Mexico's clubs and an unrewarding league format. Consequently, teams from Mexico that placed high in the league standings could not afford to participate in the overarching continental competitions, such as the Copa Libertadores.

The Mexican league boom
The 1970 World Cup held in Mexico was the first World Cup televised on a grand scale. The season following the FIFA World Cup, the F.M.F. changed the league format and established a playoff phase to determine the national champion. This was done to regenerate interest and reward teams that placed fairly high in the standings.  

The play-off, called the Liguilla, was played using various formats to determine the champion. The most common format was a straight knock-out between the top eight teams in the table. At other times the league was divided into groups with the top two in each group, often as well as the best 3rd placed teams, qualifying for the play-offs and in some seasons the play-offs themselves involved teams playing in groups with the group winners playing off for the title. The format was changed from season to season to accommodate international club commitments and the schedule of the Mexico national team.

The change in the rules affected teams that traditionally dominated the table, as talented teams that had not performed well in the regular season were able to perform successfully in the play-offs (Cruz Azul in the 1970s, América in the 1980s, and Toluca in the 2000s).

Liga MX
Prior to the start of the 2012–13 season, the organization Liga MX / Ascenso MX was created to replace the Mexican Football Federation as the organizing body of the competition. The league also announced a rebranding, with the introduction of a new logo.

On 20 August 2018, it was announced that Liga MX would begin testing the use of video assistant referee technology. The initial test run will be conducted during under-20 matches played inside senior league stadiums, with live testing across senior Liga MX matches to take place during weeks 13 and 14 of the Apertura tournament. The league will, however, still need final approval from FIFA to fully implement the technology.

Competition format

Regular season tournaments

Liga MX uses a single table of 18 teams that play two annual tournaments resulting in two champions per season. The season opens with the apertura tournament (opening tournament- running from July to December) followed by the clausura (closing – running from January to May). This format matches other Latin American schedules and corresponds with FIFA's world footballing calendar, which "opens" in July/August and "closes" in April/May of the next year. The top 12 teams advance to the liguilla for each tournament, with the top 4 teams in the table at the end of the regular phase of the tournament qualifying directly to the liguilla, and the next 8 teams qualifying for the play-in round that determines the next 4 liguilla spots. If one team is in last place in the league's relegation table (see below), that team is replaced by the team that finished 13th in the tournament.

From 1996 to 2002, the league followed a two-tournament schedule with invierno (winter) and verano (summer) tournaments but from 2002 to 2011 the 18 teams were divided into three groups of six with the top two teams from each group and the two best third place teams qualified for the liguilla. The teams played in the same group for each tournament. The qualification phase of the tournament lasted 17 weeks, with all teams playing each other once per tournament in a home and away series over both tournaments.

Playoffs (liguilla)
The liguilla (Spanish for "little league") is the play-off phase of the tournament. This phase starts with the qualifying round, with teams ranked 5–12 playing a single match hosted by the higher seed with the winner decided on the night. After this round, the four qualifying round advances to the quarterfinals against the 4 bye teams with the winner on aggregate-score progressing. The Champion team is awarded the First division trophy, and the runner up is awarded a smaller version of the trophy. The birth of La liguilla in 1970 modernized the league despite the disagreements between the traditionalists and the modernists. Clubs that were near bankruptcy were now better able to compete and generate profits.

Relegation
Originally at the end of a season, after the Apertura and Clausura tournaments, one team is relegated to the next lower division, Ascenso MX, and one team from that division is promoted and takes the place left open by the relegated team. Currently, the relegated team is determined by computing the points-per-game-played ratio for each team, considering all the games played by the team during the last three seasons (six tournaments). The team with the lowest ratio is relegated; if the team that is in last place in the relegation table is among the 12 teams qualifying for the Liguilla at the end of the Clausura tournament, the 13th place team qualifies for the Liguilla instead. For teams recently promoted, only the games played since their promotion are considered (two or four tournaments). The team promoted from Ascenso MX is the winner of a two-leg match between the champions of the Apertura and Clausura tournaments of that division. If a team becomes the champion in both tournaments, it is automatically promoted.

Prior to the start of the 2017–18 season, the rules for relegation and promotion changed: if a team wins promotion but does not meet certain Liga MX requirements (e.g. stadium infrastructure and a youth team) the relegated Liga MX team of that season will be obligated to pay the prize money to the Ascenso MX team (MXN$120 million) for winning the promotion playoff, which should be utilized to fulfill necessary requirements for promotion within the next season, and remain in Ascenso MX, and the relegated Liga MX team will remain in the first division. However, if the relegated Liga MX team cannot distribute the prize money to the promoted Ascenso MX team, both teams will lose their right to play in Liga MX and must play in Ascenso MX the following season.

As of the 2018–19 season, only six teams met the full requirements to be promoted to Liga MX, those teams being Atlético San Luis, Atlante, Celaya, Juárez, Sinaloa, and UdeG.

On April 16, 2020, the Ascenso MX, the 2nd division of the Mexican football league system, was folded due to the 2019–20 coronavirus pandemic as well as the lack of financial resources. Liga MX President Enrique Bonilla later announced during a video meeting with the club owners of the league that promotion and relegation would be suspended for six years. During the suspension, the Ascenso MX was replaced with the Liga de Expansión MX although no club from that league will be promoted to the Liga MX nor any Liga MX team that performs poorly will be relegated from the Liga MX for the time being.

CONCACAF Champions League qualification
Each year, four teams from Liga MX qualify for the CONCACAF Champions League, the premier North American club competition. Generally, the Apertura and Clausura champions and the Apertura and Clausura runners-up qualify and are placed in Pot 3. Should one or more teams reach the finals of both tournaments, Liga MX has implemented a formula for ensuring that two teams that qualify via the Apertura and two teams qualify via the Clausura:

If the same two teams qualify for the finals of both tournaments, those two teams will qualify along with the non-finalists with the best record in both the Apertura and Clausura.
If the same team wins both the Apertura and the Clausura (facing two different teams in the finals of each tournament), then the berth reserved for the Clausura champions is passed to the Clausura runners-up and the berth reserved for the Clausura runners-up is passed to the non-finalists with the best record in the Clausura. This occurred most recently in the 2013–14 season (2014–15 CONCACAF Champions League) when León (2013 Apertura and 2014 Clausura champions) and Pachuca (2014 Clausura runners-up) were placed in Pot A, while América (2013 Apertura runners-up) and Cruz Azul (non-finalists with the best record in the 2014 Clausura) were placed in Pot B (at the time, the champions and runners-up were placed in different pots).
If the Apertura runners-up win the Clausura (facing two different teams in the finals of each tournament), then the berth reserved for the Apertura runners-up is passed to the non-finalists with the best record in the Apertura. This occurred most recently in the 2011–12 season (2012–13 CONCACAF Champions League) when UANL (2011 Apertura champions) and Santos Laguna (2011 Apertura runners-up and 2012 Clausura champions) were placed in Pot A, while Guadalajara (non-finalists with the best record in the 2011 Apertura) and Monterrey (2012 Clausura runners-up) were placed in Pot B (again, at the time, the champions and runners-up were placed in different pots).
If the Apertura champions are runners-up of the Clausura (facing two different teams in the finals of each tournament), then the berth reserved for the Clausura runners-up is passed to the non-finalists with the best record in the Clausura. This has not happened since Liga MX began using this qualification procedure.

Previous Qualification Tournaments
Campeonato Centroamericano (1959)
Copa Interamericana (1968–1991)
CONCACAF Cup Winners Cup (1991–1998)
CONCACAF Giants Cup (2001)
InterLiga (2004–2010)
Copa Sudamericana (2005–2008)
SuperLiga (2007–2010) 
Copa Libertadores (1998–2015)

Clubs and champions

2022–23 season
The following 18 clubs will compete in the Liga MX during the 2022–23 season.

Champions

Bold indicates clubs currently playing in Liga MX.

Stadiums and locations

Media coverage

All First Division clubs have the right to sell their own broadcast rights. Televisa, TV Azteca, Imagen Televisión, Claro Sports, Fox Sports, and ESPN have broadcasting rights in México, while ESPN Deportes, Fox Deportes,  Univision, and Telemundo have the rights in the United States, with FS1/FS2 airing select matches with English commentary.

In previous years, when a team was relegated, the team that was promoted could only negotiate with the company holding the television rights of the relegated team. This agreement was canceled by Liga MX in 2012 when the promotion of Club León caused a television rights dispute with Televisa. Currently, Club León matches are broadcast in Mexico by Fox Sports and other online media sites, and in the United States by Univision (Telemundo from 2013–16).

Telelatino and Fox Sports World formerly hold broadcasting rights in Canada. From 2019–20 until 2021–22, OneSoccer broadcast the league for Canada viewers. 

Fox Sports is the only network that holds rights to broadcast selected matches in United States and South America. 

Additionally, Televisa-owned networks Sky Sports and TUDN hold exclusive broadcasting rights over selected matches throughout the regular season, although the majority of the most important ones are broadcast live on the national networks. The coverage also available for Central America viewers.

Most of the Saturday afternoon and evening matches broadcast by Televisa are shown primarily on Gala TV, though Saturday games played by Televisa's club America, are broadcast on Televisa's flagship network, Canal de las Estrellas. However, a blackout policy is usually applied in selected markets where affiliates are forced to air alternate programming during the matches, Sunday noon and afternoon games broadcast by Televisa are shown on Canal de las Estrellas. All of the games broadcast by TV Azteca on Saturday and Sunday are shown on Azteca 13; Friday's matches however are shown on Azteca 7.  Tuesday, Wednesday and Thursday (known in Mexico as Fecha Doble or Double Date) matches picked by the national networks are shown on Canal 5 and Azteca 7 and the rest of the matches air on Sky Sports and TDN.

A recent rule, in effect since 2011, requires teams to play the final game of every season on Sunday during prime time, regardless of whether the team used to play local games in another timeslot, in order to capture more television audience during the game. This also prevents most playoff collusion, where one or both teams already in the liguilla  put in lesser effort to lose or draw, in order to draw a more favorable opponent.

For the Apertura 2016, and the majority of the Clausura 2017, Guadalajara home matches in Mexico were not shown on over-the-air television or cable and satellite operators. Instead, they were exclusively shown on an internet streaming service called Chivas TV. As of April 8, 2017, the matches are shown on both Televisa's Televisa Deportes Network (TDN) and Chivas TV.

On February 13, 2017, it was announced Univision Deportes would live stream 46 games in English on Facebook in the United States.

After the Clausura 2017 season, Azteca América sold the rights of the Atlas, Morelia, Tijuana, and Veracruz matches to Univision. The network then held the rights of 17 of the 18 clubs, only missing recently promoted Lobos BUAP. In September 2017, Univision began airing Lobos BUAP's home matches, thus holding the rights to all 18 Liga MX teams through the end of the Clausura 2018 season.

In July 2017, Televisión Nacional de Chile (TVN) announced it would show Liga MX matches involving Chilean players in Chile.

In October 2017, Fox Sports announced that it acquired the long-term exclusive Spanish-language rights to Tijuana and Santos Laguna home matches in the United States, Mexico, and the rest of Latin America starting in the Apertura 2018 and Apertura 2019 respectively, thus ending Univision's monopoly. The matches air on Fox Sports in the United States (via Fox Deportes) and the rest of Latin America (including Mexico and excluding Brazil).

On May 26, 2018, Fox Sports announced it acquired the rights of C.F. Monterrey's home matches in the United States and Latin America. The network announced the matches would be shown in the United States on Fox Deportes in Spanish as well as the Fox Sports family of networks in English.

As of the Apertura 2019 season, via a sublicense agreement with Univision, ESPN Deportes airs the majority of León, Necaxa, Pachuca, Querétaro, and UANL regular season home matches in the United States. The network also airs at least one home match of nine other clubs. Televisa also sublicenses one match per week to ESPN in Mexico and Central America.

In Brazil, DAZN broadcast the league for two seasons 2019–20 and 2020–21.

On 15 July, 2021, OneFootball announced it would broadcast between two and five live matches as part of a deal covering the 2021/22 Liga MX season in selected international markets.

On 16 August, 2021, Eleven Sports announced it would broadcast the home Liga MX matches of C.D. Guadalajara for the 2021-22 season in more than 100 countries.

Broadcast rights

Sponsorship

Up until its rebranding in 2012, the Liga MX did not have a title sponsor. In July 2013, league president Decio de María announced BBVA Bancomer as the official sponsor, with the goal of modernizing the league's image. De María also stated that the money generated from the sponsorship would be divided among the 18 clubs and to be invested in each club's youth teams. On 18 September 2015, the sponsorship deal was extended until 2019. On 18 June 2019, the league was renamed as Liga BBVA MX, adopting the new identity of the sponsor. On 4 July 2019, the sponsorship contract with BBVA was renewed until 2021.

Since 1986, Voit has been the official match ball manufacturer. In 2014, the contract was extended for four years.

Managers
The current managers in the Liga MX are:

Player records

Most appearances

Most goals

Promotion and relegation

Notes:
1976–77: Tampico Madero bought San Luis's spot in first division.
1977–78: Deportivo Neza bought San Isidro Laguna and took its spot.
1981–82: Tampico Madero bought Atletas Campesinos and took over its spot.
1983–84: Ángeles de Puebla bought Oaxtepec and took over its spot.
1988–89: C.D. Veracruz bought Potros Neza  and took over its spot.
1992–93: U.T. Neza changes its name to Toros Neza.
1996–97: UANL gained automatic promotion as they won both tournaments.
1998–99: Puebla bought Unión de Curtidores and took over its spot.
1999–00: Irapuato gained automatic promotion as they won both tournaments.
2009–10: Necaxa gained automatic promotion as they won both tournaments.
2012–13: Chiapas relocated to Querétaro rebranding to Querétaro.
2012–13: C.D. Veracruz bought Reboceros de La Piedad's spot in first division.
2017–18: Tapachula won promotion to Liga MX, but were not certified to be promoted to Liga MX.
2018–19: Atlético San Luis gained automatic promotion as they won both tournaments.

See also

References

External links

 

 
1
Mex
1943 establishments in Mexico
Sports leagues established in 1943
Professional sports leagues in Mexico